Events from the year 1524 in Ireland.

Incumbent
Lord: Henry VIII

Events
June – Gerald FitzGerald, 9th Earl of Kildare was exonerated in a Royal inquiry at Christ Church, Dublin.

Births

Deaths

References

 
1520s in Ireland
Ireland
Years of the 16th century in Ireland